Herbert Topp (April 20, 1900 – May 6, 1994) was an American water polo player. He competed in the men's tournament at the 1928 Summer Olympics.

References

1900 births
1994 deaths
American male water polo players
Olympic water polo players of the United States
Water polo players at the 1928 Summer Olympics
Sportspeople from Copenhagen